The Wight Baby was a British single-seat seaplane fighter produced by John Samuel White & Company Limited (Wight Aircraft). Only three prototype aircraft were built.

Design and development
Designed by Howard T. Wright and built by the aircraft department of the shipbuilder J. Samuel White & Company Ltd., the Wight Baby was a single-bay biplane with ailerons on the top wings only and a fabric-covered wooden fuselage. It was powered by a 100 hp (75 kW) Gnome Monosoupape rotary engine driving a four-bladed propeller. Three prototypes were constructed (Nos. 9097, 9098 and 9099), and service trials were undertaken at the Seaplane Experimental Station at Felixstowe and also at the Isle of Grain, but the aircraft's performance was not good enough for any further development work or volume production to be carried out.

Specifications (Baby)

See also

References

Floatplanes
Wight aircraft
Single-engined tractor aircraft
Biplanes
Rotary-engined aircraft